Asus Xonar is a lineup of PC sound cards by Taiwanese electronics manufacturer ASUS.
The lineup currently comprises the following models:

References

External links

 ASUS sound cards

Asus products